Penyevo is a rural locality (a village) in Staroselskoye Rural Settlement, Mezhdurechensky District, Vologda Oblast, Russia. The population was 1 as of 2002.

Geography 
Penyevo is located 28 km southwest of Shuyskoye (the district's administrative centre) by road. Svyatogorye is the nearest rural locality.

References 

Rural localities in Mezhdurechensky District, Vologda Oblast